Petronella Barker (born 12 October 1942 in Sittingbourne, Kent) is an English actress.

Life
The daughter of the comedy actor Eric Barker and the actress Pearl Hackney, she grew up in the village of Stalisfield, Kent, and was educated at Ashford School.

Barker trained at the Central School of Speech and Drama from 1960 to 1963, in her final year winning the Carlton Hobbs Bursary, which gave her a six-month contract with the BBC's Radio Drama Company. In 1964 she joined the English Stage Company at the Royal Court Theatre for three plays: Inadmissible Evidence (understudy), Julius Caesar (crowd and understudy), and Cuckoo in the Nest, in which she played Rawlins. During four seasons with the National Theatre Company at the Old Vic Theatre between 1964 and 1968 she appeared in: Hobson's Choice (as Ada Figgins), Mother Courage and Her Children (Yvette), A Flea in her Ear (Eugenie), The Storm (Glasha), The Dance of Death (Jenny), Othello (Crowd), Juno and the Paycock (Neighbour), The Crucible (Mercy Lewis), Rosencrantz and Guildenstern are Dead (Courtier and Attendant), and Volpone (Androgyno). She played Miss Prue in William Congreve's play Love for Love at the Old Vic Theatre with Laurence Olivier, directed by Peter Wood.

On 2 September 1966, at St Mary's, Stalisfield, Barker married actor Anthony Hopkins; they have one daughter, the actress and singer-songwriter Abigail Hopkins, born in 1968. The couple were divorced in the High Court, London, in 1972.

Selected filmography
1987: The Bretts (TV series) — "All Right on the Night" – Miss Brownlie
1983: Dramarama (TV series) — "Mighty Mum and the Petnappers" – Godmother
1981: Roger Doesn't Live Here Anymore (TV series) — Episode #1.4 – Nanny
1981: Jackanory Playhouse (TV series) — "The Toy Princess" – Lady-in-waiting
1978: Armchair Thriller (TV series) — A Dog's Ransom: Part 5 – Gillian
1976: The Molly Wopsies (TV series) — "The Initiation" – Gypsy woman
1975: Moody and Pegg (TV series) — "Roland's Ladies" – Miss Thompkins
1975: Armchair Cinema (TV series) — "In Sickness and in Health" – The District Nurse
1975: Within These Walls (TV series) — "Playground"  – Joan Dunn
1973: A Pin to See the Peepshow (TV series) — Anne Ackroyd (all episodes)
1972–1973: Z-Cars (TV series) — Angela (2 episodes) / Pat Mason (1 episode)
1972: The Fenn Street Gang (TV series) — "The Loneliest Night of the Week" – Waitress
1972: It's Murder But Is It Art? (TV series) — Fanny Templer
1971: The Rivals of Sherlock Holmes (TV series) — Miss Parrot (2 episodes)
1971: Budgie (TV series) — "And in Again" – Traffic Warden
1971: The Mind of Mr. J.G. Reeder (TV series) — "The Fatal Engagement" – Miss Trottington-Fox
1970: The Mating Machine (TV series) — "Ada's Last Chance" – Miss Jones
1970: Germinal (TV mini-series) — Cécile (2 episodes)
1967: A Flea in Her Ear (TV movie) — Eugénie
1965: Othello — Company
1964: Call the Gun Expert (TV series) — "The Green Bicycle Case – 1919" – Bella Wright
1964: Detective (TV series) – "Trent's Last Case" (1964) — Celestine

References

External links
 

1942 births
Living people
English stage actresses
English television actresses
People from Sittingbourne
People from Stalisfield Green